Johnnier Esteiner Montaño Caicedo (born 14 January 1983) is a retired Colombian professional footballer who played as an attacking midfielder.

His brother, Victor Hugo Montaño is also a footballer.

Club career 
Earning recognition on the international scene at such a young age, Montaño was considered a potential star, and signed for Italian club Parma in 1999 along with team-mate Jorge Bolaño. Over the new few years Montaño suffered personal problems, and he was repeatedly loaned out after failing to break into the Parma first team, firstly to Hellas Verona for the 2001–02 season, and then to Piacenza from 2002–2003. He only made limited appearances for both teams, who coincidentally both ended up relegated from Serie A while Montaño was there.

With limited opportunities in Italy, Montaño embarked on a nomadic career, first returning to his native Colombia to sign for América de Cali, and subsequently Independiente Santa Fe. After finishing periods at Al-Wakra in Qatar and Cortuluá back in Colombia, he considered retiring, before enjoying a more successful stint at Sport Boys in Peru.

After scoring 9 goals for Sport Boys, Montaño was wanted by many of the larger Peruvian teams. Both Universitario and Alianza Lima claimed to have signed him. Finally, despite having signed a pre-contract with Universitario, Montaño was signed by Alianza Lima.

After a two season stay with no mayor achievement in the Peruvian league he was loaned to Konyaspor.

Johnier Montaño dissociated himself from his team after problems with the club if the club back to its pass Deuno Alianza Lima.

In June 2010, Montaño signed a 1-year contract with Turkish side Konyaspor.

After a spell at Chavelines Juniors in 2020, Montaño retired at the end of the year.

International career
Montaño was a highly rated young player at Quilmes in Argentina and set records by featuring for the Colombia national team at the young age of 15, doing well enough to earn a spot on the team that went to the 1999 Copa América. Montaño scored the final goal in a 3–0 win for Colombia over Argentina in a game best remembered for Martin Palermo missing 3 penalty kicks. He later went on to represent Colombia at the 2001 South American Youth Championships. He made his last appearance for the full national team in 2003.

Personal life
Johnnier is the father of Jhonnier Montaño Jr, who also is a professional footballer.

References

External links

 

1983 births
Living people
Colombian footballers
Colombia international footballers
Colombian expatriate footballers
América de Cali footballers
Quilmes Atlético Club footballers
Parma Calcio 1913 players
Hellas Verona F.C. players
Piacenza Calcio 1919 players
Independiente Santa Fe footballers
Al-Wakrah SC players
Cortuluá footballers
Sport Boys footballers
Club Alianza Lima footballers
Club Deportivo Universidad de San Martín de Porres players
Konyaspor footballers
FBC Melgar footballers
Academia Deportiva Cantolao players
Categoría Primera A players
Serie A players
Qatar Stars League players
Peruvian Primera División players
Peruvian Segunda División players
Süper Lig players
1999 Copa América players
Association football midfielders
Footballers from Cali
Colombian expatriate sportspeople in Argentina
Colombian expatriate sportspeople in Italy
Colombian expatriate sportspeople in Peru
Colombian expatriate sportspeople in Turkey
Colombian expatriate sportspeople in Qatar
Expatriate footballers in Argentina
Expatriate footballers in Italy
Expatriate footballers in Peru
Expatriate footballers in Turkey
Expatriate footballers in Qatar